Eoacmaea is a genus of sea snails or true limpets, marine gastropod mollusks in the subclass Patellogastropoda, the true limpets. 

Eoacmaea is the only genus in the family Eoacmaeidae, belonging to the superfamily Lottioidea.

Etymology 
The generic name Eoacmaea is composed from the Eo that mean "early" in Greek and Acmaea, that is the genus of gastropod in family Lottiidae.

Taxonomy 
The family Eoacmaeidae was established by Nakano & Ozawa (2007) for the genus Eoacmaea.

A cladogram based on sequences of mitochondrial 12S ribosomal RNA, 16S ribosomal RNA and cytochrome-c oxidase I (COI) genes showing phylogenic relations of Patellogastropoda by Nakano & Ozawa (2007) and superfamilies based on World Register of Marine Species:

Eoacmaea is the most basal group within Patellogastropoda and Eoacmaea have diversified from other Patellogastropoda in Tethys Ocean in Triassic or Jurassic about 203 million years ago (limits are from 143 to 279 million years ago).

Species 
Species within the genus Eoacmaea include:
 Eoacmaea albonotata (Smith, 1901)
 Eoacmaea calamus (Crosse & Fischer, 1864)
 Eoacmaea ceylanica (E.A. Smith, 1911)
 Eoacmaea chamorrorum (Lindberg & Vermeij, 1985)
 Eoacmaea conoidalis (Pease, 1868)
 Eoacmaea ivani (Christiaens, 1975)
 Eoacmaea javanica (Nakano, Aswan & Ozawa, 2005)
 Eoacmaea mauritiana (Pilsbry, 1891)
 Eoacmaea omanensis (Christiaens, 1975)
 Eoacmaea perfestiva (Faber, 2004)
 Eoacmaea profunda (Deshayes, 1863) - type species
 Eoacmaea pustulata (Helbling, 1779)
 Eoacmaea semirubida (Dall, 1914)

References